TNBC was an American teen-oriented programming block.

TNBC may also refer to:

 Triple-negative breast cancer, any breast cancer that does not express the genes for estrogen receptor, progesterone receptor, and HER2/neu
The Nightmare Before Christmas, a 1993 stop-motion musical film